Dale Reid  (born 20 March 1959) is a Scottish professional golfer from Ladybank, Fife. She is one of the most successful players in the history of the Ladies European Tour, with 21 tournament victories. She topped the Order of Merit in 1984 and 1987 and was made a life member of the tour after collecting her 20th title at the 1991 Ford Classic. She played for Europe in the first four Solheim Cups (1990, 1992, 1994 and 1996) and was Europe's non-playing captain in 2000 and 2002.

She worked full-time in a care home in Cupar, Fife for a short time as a social care worker, shortly after leaving this job she moved to Australia where she now resides.

Reid was named an Officer of the Order of the British Empire on the 2001 Queen's New Year's Honours List, following the 2000 Solheim Cup win.

Crash
While driving with her partner in Gladstone, Queensland in 2010, she was a victim of a fatal crash with a truck. She survived with minor cuts and bruises, but the driver of the other truck, along with his son, was killed.

Professional wins (23)

Ladies European Tour wins (21)
1980 (1) Carlsberg Championship – Finham Park
1981 (2) Carlsberg Championship – Gleneagles, Moben Kitchens Classic
1982 (1) Guernsey Open
1983 (3) United Friendly Tournament, Lilley Brook Cotswold Ladies Classic, Caldy Classic
1984 (2) UBM Northern Classic, JS Bloor Eastleigh Classic
1985 (2) Ulster Volkswagen Classic, Brend Hotels International
1986 (1) British Olivetti Tournament
1987 (4) Ulster Volkswagen Open, Volmac Dutch Open, La Manga Club Ladies European Open, Bowring Ladies Scottish Open
1988 (2) Birchgrey European Open, Toshiba Players Championship
1990 (1) Haninge Ladies Open
1991 (2) Ford Ladies' Classic, Bloor Homes Eastleigh Classic

Other wins (2)
1990 Women's Victorian Open
1993 Rörstrand Ladies Open (Sweden)

Team appearances
Professional
Solheim Cup (representing Europe): 1990, 1992 (winners), 1994, 1996

See also
List of golfers with most Ladies European Tour wins

References

External links

Who is Dale Reid

Scottish female golfers
Ladies European Tour golfers
Solheim Cup competitors for Europe
Officers of the Order of the British Empire
People educated at Bell Baxter High School
Sportspeople from Fife
1959 births
Living people